Dr. B. R. Ambedkar University Delhi, formerly Bharat Ratna Dr. B. R. Ambedkar University Delhi and Ambedkar University Delhi, and simply AUD, is a state university established by the Government of the NCT of Delhi through an Act of the Delhi Legislature. The university began functioning in August 2008. It is a Unitary non-affiliating University whose main focus is on undergraduate and postgraduate studies and on research in the Humanities and the Social Sciences. It is completely funded by the State Government of the NCT of Delhi. The university is now declared eligible to receive Central Government Assistance. The university has been graded 'A' by National Assessment and Accreditation Council. It is named after the polymath B. R. Ambedkar, the architect of the Indian Constitution and one of the founding fathers of India.

Campuses 
AUD is a multi-campus University with planned facilities across the city. AUD presently has three campuses - in Kashmere Gate, Karampura and, Lodhi Road, where 40 undergraduate, postgraduate and research programmes are currently on offer.

The Kashmere Gate campus is housed in the erstwhile Guru Gobind Singh Indraprastha University campus, along with Indira Gandhi Delhi Technical University for Women. The historical campus originally built for Delhi College of Engineering also houses the 300-year-old Dara Shikoh library. It is located close to the Delhi Vidhan Sabha, Old Delhi Railway Station, St. James' Church, Delhi and Red Fort and of course Kashmiri Gate (it is the northern gate to the historic walled city of Delhi. Built by the Mughal Emperor Shah Jahan, the gate is so named because it used to start a road that led to Kashmir). It is accessible by the red, the yellow and the violet line of Delhi Metro. It is a five-minute walk from the Kashmere Gate metro station.

The School of Education Studies shifted to a new campus located in Lodhi Road in September 2017. The campus was earlier a Govt. Co-ed Sr. Sec. School. The campus can be accessed through two metro stations namely, Jor Bagh metro station and Jawaharlal Nehru Stadium metro station.

The Directorate of Higher Education, Government of the NCT of Delhi handed over the old campus of Deen Dayal Upadhyaya College of University of Delhi in the Karampura area of West Delhi to AUD. Deen Dayal Upadhyaya College will move to its new campus in Dwarka.

Future plans 

The university is developing two new campuses in Rohini Sector 3 and in Dheerpur. These campuses will be ready by 2020.  The 110 acre Dheerpur campus will include a 60-acre biodiversity park to conserve the wetlands. The future campus is planned to be energy-efficient, ecologically-frugal and disabled-friendly. It will include academic, residential, recreational and social facilities for students and staff.

Schools
 School of Undergraduate Studies
 School of Development Studies
 School of Global Affairs
 School of Human Ecology
 School of Human Studies
 School of Culture and Creative Expressions
 School of Design
 School of Business, Public Policy and Social Entrepreneurship
 School of Educational Studies
 School of Law, Governance and Citizenship
 School of Liberal Studies
 School of Vocational Studies

Centres 
 Centre for Community Knowledge
 Centre for Development Practice
 Centre for Social Science Research Methods
 Centre for Early Childhood Education and Development
 Centre for Psychotherapy and Clinical Research
 Centre for Urban Ecology and Sustainability
 AUD Centre for Incubation, Innovation and Entrepreneurship
Centre for English Language Education

References

Ambedkar University Delhi
2008 establishments in Delhi
Educational institutions established in 2008